Matthias Denman (1760 - 1838) is one of the founders of the settlement that eventually became Cincinnati, Ohio.

References 
 Ohio History Central

Ohio pioneers
1760 births
1838 deaths